The Eagle Gate monument is a historical monument—more in the form of an arch than a gate—seventy-six feet across, situated at the intersection of State Street at South Temple, adjacent to Temple Square, in Salt Lake City, Utah.

History

The monument was erected in 1859 and commemorates the entrance to Brigham Young's property at the mouth of City Creek Canyon. Carved by Ralph Ramsay, the original wooden eagle is on display at the Daughters of Utah Pioneers Museum located at 300 North Main Street.

The first Eagle Gate was remodeled and enlarged with new stone piers and wider inverted arches in the early 1890s (with Ralph Ramsay's eagle rebuilt and fortified); designed by Don Carlos Young, an architect son of Brigham Young.  Due to the widening of State Street in the early 1960s, the prior monument including Ramsay's eagle was removed and replaced with a much wider and larger third generation Eagle Gate, designed by Salt Lake City architect George Cannon Young.  Young was the son of Don Carlos Young and the grandson of Brigham Young. The monument is one of Salt Lake City's best known pioneer landmarks, and its current design is one of Salt Lake City's best standing examples of Mid-Century Modern design.

References

External links

1859 sculptures
Buildings and structures completed in 1859
Monuments and memorials in Utah
Outdoor sculptures in Salt Lake City
Sculptures of birds in the United States
Temple Square